Andile is a given name. Notable people with the given name include:

Andile Dlamini (born 1992), South African footballer
Andile Fikizolo (born 1994), South African footballer
Andile Jali (born 1990), South African footballer
Andile Jho (born 1992), South African rugby union player
Andile Khumalo (born 1978), South African composer and music lecturer
Andile Lili, South African Member of the Western Cape Provincial Parliament
Andile Lungisa (born 1979), South African politician and the former deputy president of the African National Congress Youth League (ANCYL). 
Andile Mbanjwa (born 1998), South African professional footballer
Andile Mngxitama, South African politician and the president of the Black First Land First party
Andile Mokgakane (born 1999), South African cricketer
Andile Ncobo (born 1967),  South African footballer
Andile Ngcaba (born 1956), South African businessman
Andile Phehlukwayo (born 1996), South African cricketer
Andile Witbooi (1991–2019), South African rugby union player
Andile Yenana (born 1968), South African pianist